Kaarlen kenttä is a multi-use stadium in Vaasa, Finland. It is currently used mostly for athletics. The stadium holds 7,500 people.

External links
 Venue information

Football venues in Finland